Billbergia meyeri is a species of flowering plant in the genus Billbergia. This species is native to Bolivia and Brazil.

References

meyeri
Flora of Bolivia
Flora of Brazil